Anavryta (Greek: Ανάβρυτα), may refer to:

The Anavryta Experimental Lyceum in Athens, Greece
The Anavryta Experimental Gymnasium in Athens, Greece
Anavryta, a neighbourhood of the city of Marousi in northeast suburban Athens, Greece
Anavryta, Grevena, a village in the Grevena regional unit